Amauropsis is a genus of predatory sea snails, marine gastropod mollusks in the family Naticidae, the moon snails.

Species
Species within the genus Amauropsis include:
 Amauropsis anderssoni (Strebel, 1906)
 Amauropsis apora (R. B. Watson, 1881)
 Amauropsis aureolutea (Strebel, 1908)
 Amauropsis bransfieldensis (Preston, 1916)
 Amauropsis brassiculina (Locard, 1897)
 Amauropsis georgiana (Strebel, 1908)
 Amauropsis godfroyi (Lamy, 1910) (taxon inquirendum)
 Amauropsis islandica (Gmelin, 1791)
 Amauropsis powelli Dell, 1990
 Amauropsis prasina (Watson, 1881)
 Amauropsis rossiana Smith, 1907
 Amauropsis sphaeroides (Jeffreys, 1877)
 Amauropsis subpallescens (Strebel, 1908)
Species brought into synonymy
 Amauropsis globulus Angas, 1880: synonym of Problitora globula (Angas, 1880)
 Amauropsis moerchi A. Adams & Angas, 1864: synonym of Problitora moerchi (A. Adams & Angas, 1864): synonym of Alexania moerchi (A. Adams & Angas, 1864)
 Amauropsis purpurea Dall, 1871: synonym of Amauropsis islandica (Gmelin, 1791)
 Amauropsis subperforata (Dell, 1956): synonym of Falsilunatia subperforata Dell, 1956
 Amauropsis xantha (Watson, 1881): synonym of Falsilunatia xantha (Watson, 1881)

References

 Torigoe K. & Inaba A. (2011). Revision on the classification of Recent Naticidae. Bulletin of the Nishinomiya Shell Museum. 7: 133 + 15 pp., 4 pls.
 Gofas, S.; Le Renard, J.; Bouchet, P. (2001). Mollusca. in: Costello, M.J. et al. (eds), European Register of Marine Species: a check-list of the marine species in Europe and a bibliography of guides to their identification. Patrimoines Naturels. 50: 180-213

External links
 Mørch O. A. (1857). Fortegnelse over Grønlands Bløddyr. [in] Rink, Grønland geographisk og statistik beskrivet. Kjøbenhavn, Louis Klein: 75-100

Naticidae
Gastropod genera